Daniel Miguel Alves Gomes (born 7 August 1983), commonly known as Danny, is a Portuguese former professional footballer who played as an attacking midfielder. Also a winger, he was known for his dribbling and key passes.

He spent most of his career in Russia in service of Dynamo Moscow and Zenit, after arriving at the age of 21 from Sporting. He won six items of silverware with Zenit, including three Russian Premier League titles.

Danny represented Portugal at the 2010 World Cup and the 2004 Olympics.

Club career

Marítimo / Sporting
Born to Portuguese parents in Caracas, Venezuela, Danny moved to the island of Madeira when he was 15 years old. There, he developed his football skills in the youth teams of C.S. Marítimo, making his professional debut in a 2–1 Primeira Liga home win against Gil Vicente F.C. on 1 October 2001. A few months later he scored his first goal in a 1–2 loss at S.C. Salgueiros, also being sent off in the 60th minute; he finished his first season with five goals in 20 games.

Having signed to Sporting CP for €2.1 million after that sole season, Danny was immediately loaned back to Marítimo, returning in June 2004 and going on to appear in 12 official matches for the Lions.

Dynamo Moscow

In February 2005, Danny joined Russia's FC Dynamo Moscow in a deal worth €2 million. The club was also involved in other transfer deals of Portuguese and Portugal-based players at the time, including Derlei and Maniche.

Danny would eventually be the one with the most success in the country, being awarded the "Player of the Year" award and leading the team to a second-place finish in 2008. His last appearance for Dynamo came on 23 August 2008, in a 1–1 away draw against FC Spartak Moscow.

Zenit

On 24 August 2008, Danny was bought by FC Zenit St. Petersburg for a fee of €30 million, which made him the most expensive player of the Russian Premier League. Upon his arrival manager Dick Advocaat hailed him as "the best midfielder in Russia", and he made his debut in the UEFA Super Cup game against Manchester United where he scored the winning goal, later being named Man of the match in a 2–1 final win; as the team finished the season in fifth place the player contributed with ten league goals, the competition's joint second-best.

On 14 June 2011, Danny signed a contract extension, prolonging his stay in Saint Petersburg by a further four years. He played in all six group stage games in the 2011–12 edition of the UEFA Champions League, scoring in a 3–1 home win against FC Porto as they eventually finished second in their group, level on points with winners APOEL FC – the match also happened to be the player's 100th appearance in a Zenit jersey; on 6 February 2012, however, he suffered an anterior cruciate ligament injury to his right knee, being sidelined for the following eight months.

Danny returned to training in August 2012, and played in his first match since the injury in September. Shortly after Igor Denisov was sent to the youth team for improper conduct, he was appointed club captain.

Down 0–2 at home to Málaga CF on 21 November for the Champions League group stage, Danny exchanged passes with Tomáš Hubočan before scoring Zenit's first goal. With three minutes left in the game, he missed from less than a metre from goal before the ball was rebounded to Victor Fayzulin, who managed to find the net for the final 2–2 draw. On 4 December, against A.C. Milan, he netted the game's only goal as his side won at the San Siro in the last contest; the result was in vain, however, as the Russians finished third and were relegated to the UEFA Europa League.

In a home match against FC Anzhi Makhachkala on 10 December 2012, Danny picked up a red card for dissent in a 1–1 draw, which left Zenit in third place. On 3 August of the following year, he scored a hat-trick as his team defeated FC Volga Nizhny Novgorod 3–1 in a league match.

On 26 November 2014, Danny kept Zenit in contention for a Champions League knockout place by scoring the only goal in a home victory over S.L. Benfica. For the 2014–15 season, he contributed with 28 games and three goals as the club won its second national championship in four years.

After initially announcing that he would be parting ways with Zenit on 28 May 2015, Danny agreed to a new two-year contract on 5 June, following which he left as a free agent.

Slavia Prague
On 27 June 2017, Danny signed with Czech club SK Slavia Prague. At the end of the season, his contract was dissolved by mutual consent.

Marítimo return
On 22 July 2018, Marítimo announced the return of Danny to the Estádio do Marítimo after 14 years. He was released from his contract by mutual consent on 27 December.

International career

Danny made his debut for Portugal in a friendly against the Faroe Islands, a 5–0 home win played on 20 August 2008. He scored his first goal for the national side on 19 November, opening the score against Brazil; however, it turned out to be a sour one, as the hosts came from behind to take it 6–2.

After having appeared with Portugal at the 2004 Summer Olympics in Athens, in an eventual group stage exit, while also playing regularly with the under-21s, Danny was picked in the squad that appeared at the 2010 FIFA World Cup in South Africa. He played three games in the tournament in an eventual round-of-16 exit, including the full 90 minutes in the 0–0 group stage draw to Brazil.

Danny was regularly used by managers Carlos Queiroz and Paulo Bento during the UEFA Euro 2012 qualifying campaign. On 3 September 2010, he netted in a 4–4 draw against minnows Cyprus at the Estádio D. Afonso Henriques in Guimarães after the national team led 4–2. He missed the finals in Poland and Ukraine however, due to a serious injury; also due to physical ailments, he was ruled out of the 2016 edition.

Personal life
Married to Petra Gomes, Danny fathered twin sons Bernardo and Francisco, both of which played youth football with Zenit, and daughter Emily.

Career statistics

Club

International

|}

Honours
Sporting
Supertaça Cândido de Oliveira: 2002

Zenit
Russian Football Premier League: 2010, 2011–12, 2014–15
Russian Cup: 2009–10, 2015–16
Russian Super Cup: 2011
UEFA Super Cup: 2008

Slavia Prague
Czech Cup: 2017–18
Individual
2008 UEFA Super Cup: Man of the Match
Footballer of the Year in Russia (Sport-Express): 2010
Footballer of the Year in Russia (Futbol): 2010
List of 33 top players of the Russian league: 2008 (best central midfielder), 2010 (best left winger) 2013–14 (best left winger), 2014–15 (best left winger)

Notes

References

External links

1983 births
Living people
Venezuelan people of Portuguese descent
Venezuelan emigrants to Portugal
Footballers from Caracas
Citizens of Portugal through descent
Portuguese footballers
Madeiran footballers
Association football midfielders
Primeira Liga players
Segunda Divisão players
C.S. Marítimo players
Sporting CP footballers
Sporting CP B players
Russian Premier League players
FC Dynamo Moscow players
FC Zenit Saint Petersburg players
Czech First League players
SK Slavia Prague players
Portugal youth international footballers
Portugal under-21 international footballers
Portugal international footballers
2010 FIFA World Cup players
Olympic footballers of Portugal
Footballers at the 2004 Summer Olympics
Portuguese expatriate footballers
Expatriate footballers in Russia
Expatriate footballers in the Czech Republic
Portuguese expatriate sportspeople in Russia
Portuguese expatriate sportspeople in the Czech Republic